Beat Sutter (born 12 December 1962 in Gelterkinden) is a Swiss former football striker who played throughout the 1980s and 1990s.

Sutter began his career with FC Basel in 1981 and went on to play 114 matches for the club before he left to join Neuchâtel Xamax in 1986. He spent the best years of his career at Xamax, playing over 200 games there. In 1994, he signed for Yverdon-Sport FC, but he spent just one season there and moved on to FC St. Gallen in 1995. He scored twice in 29 appearances for St. Gallen and retired in 1996, aged 33.

Honours
Neuchâtel Xamax
Swiss Super League: 1986–87, 1987–88
Swiss Super Cup: 1987, 1988, 1990

References

External links
 

1962 births
Living people
Swiss men's footballers
Switzerland international footballers
FC Basel players
Neuchâtel Xamax FCS players
Yverdon-Sport FC players
FC St. Gallen players
Association football forwards